C++ Technical Report 1 (TR1) is the common name for ISO/IEC TR 19768, C++ Library Extensions, which is a document that proposed additions to the C++ standard library for the C++03 language standard. The additions include regular expressions, smart pointers, hash tables, and random number generators.  TR1 was not a standard itself, but rather a draft document. However, most of its proposals became part of the later official standard, C++11.  Before C++11 was standardized, vendors used this document as a guide to create extensions.  The report's goal was "to build more widespread existing practice for an expanded C++ standard library".

The report was first circulated in draft form in 2005 as Draft Technical Report on C++ Library Extensions, then published in 2007 as an ISO/IEC standard as ISO/IEC TR 19768:2007.

Overview
Compilers did not need to include the TR1 components in order to conform to the C++ standard, because TR1 proposals were not part of the standard itself, only a set of possible additions that were still to be ratified. However, most of TR1 was available from Boost, and several compiler/library distributors implemented all or some of the components. TR1 is not the complete list of additions to the library that appeared in C++11. For example, C++11 includes a thread support library that is not available in TR1.

The new components were defined in the std::tr1 namespace to distinguish them from the then-current standard library.

Components
TR1 includes the following components:

General utilities
Reference wrapper – enables passing references, rather than copies, into algorithms or function objects. The feature was based on Boost.Ref. A wrapper reference is obtained from an instance of the template class reference_wrapper. Wrapper references are similar to normal references (‘&’) of the C++ language. To obtain a wrapper reference from any object the template class ref is used (for a constant reference cref is used).

Wrapper references are useful above all for template functions, when argument deduction would not deduce a reference (e.g. when forwarding arguments):
#include <iostream>
#include <tr1/functional>

void f( int &r )  { ++r; }

template< class Funct, class Arg >
void g( Funct f, Arg t )
{
  f(t);
}

int main()
{
  int i = 0;

  g( f, i );                   // 'g< void(int &r), int >' is instantiated
  std::cout << i << "\n";      // Output: 0

  g( f, std::tr1::ref(i) );    // 'g< void(int &r), reference_wrapper<int> >' is instanced
  std::cout << i << "\n";      // Output: 1
}

Smart pointers – adds several classes that simplify object lifetime management in complex cases. Three main classes are added:
shared_ptr – a reference-counted smart pointer
weak_ptr – a variant of shared_ptr that doesn't increase the reference count

The proposal is based on Boost Smart Pointer library.

Function objects
These four modules are added to the <functional> header file:

Polymorphic function wrapper (function) – can store any callable function (function pointers, member function pointers, and function objects) that uses a specified function call signature. The type does not depend on the kind of the callable used. Based on Boost.Function

Function object binders (bind) – can bind any parameter parameters to function objects. Function composition is also allowed. This is a generalized version of the standard std::bind1st and std::bind2nd bind functions. The feature is based on Boost Bind library.

Function return types (result_of) – determines the type of a call expression.

Member functions (mem_fn) – enhancement to the standard std::mem_fun and std::mem_fun_ref. Allows pointers to member functions to be treated as function objects. Based on Boost Mem Fn library.

Metaprogramming and type traits
There is now <type_traits> header file that contains many useful trait meta-templates, such as is_pod, has_virtual_destructor, remove_extent, etc. It facilitates metaprogramming by enabling queries on and transformation between different types. The proposal is based on Boost Type Traits library.

Numerical facilities

Random number generation
 new <random> header file – variate_generator, mersenne_twister, poisson_distribution, etc.
 utilities for generating random numbers using any of several Pseudorandom number generators, engines, and probability distributions

Mathematical special functions
Some features of TR1, such as the mathematical special functions and certain C99 additions, are not included in the Visual C++ implementation of TR1.
The Mathematical special functions library was not standardized in C++11.
 additions to the <cmath>/<math.h> header files – beta, legendre, etc. 

These functions will likely be of principal interest to programmers in the engineering and scientific disciplines.

The following table shows all 23 special functions described in TR1.

Each function has two additional variants. Appending the suffix ‘f’ or ‘l’ to a function name gives a function that operates on float or long double values respectively. For example:
float sph_neumannf( unsigned n, float x ) ;
long double sph_neumannl( unsigned n, long double x ) ;

Containers

Tuple types
 new <tuple> header file – tuple
 based on Boost Tuple library
 vaguely an extension of the standard std::pair
 fixed size collection of elements, which may be of different types

Fixed size array
 new <array> header file – array
 taken from Boost Array library
 as opposed to dynamic array types such as the standard std::vector

Hash tables
 new <unordered_set>, <unordered_map> header files
 they implement the unordered_set, unordered_multiset, unordered_map, and unordered_multimap classes, analogous to set, multiset, map, and multimap, respectively
 unfortunately, unordered_set and unordered_multiset cannot be used with the set_union, set_intersection, set_difference, set_symmetric_difference, and includes standard library functions, which work for set and multiset
 new implementation, not derived from an existing library, not fully API compatible with existing libraries
 like all hash tables, often provide constant time lookup of elements but the worst case can be linear in the size of the container

Regular expressions
 new <regex> header file – regex, regex_match, regex_search, regex_replace, etc.
 based on Boost RegEx library
 pattern matching library

C compatibility
C++ is designed to be compatible with the C programming language, but is not a strict superset of C due to diverging standards.  TR1 attempts to reconcile some of these differences through additions to various headers in the C++ library, such as <complex>, <locale>, <cmath>, etc.  These changes help to bring C++ more in line with the C99 version of the C standard (not all parts of C99 are included in TR1).

Technical Report 2
In 2005, a request for proposals for a TR2 was made with a special interest in Unicode, XML/HTML, Networking and usability for novice programmers.TR2 call for proposals.

Some of the proposals included:
 Threads 
 The Asio C++ library (networking ).
 Signals/Slots [sigc Proposal for standardization in C++ Library TR2]
 Filesystem Library Filesystem Library for TR2 – Based on the Boost Filesystem Library, for query/manipulation of paths, files and directories.
 Boost Any Library Any Library Proposal for TR2
 Lexical Conversion Library Conversion Library Proposal for TR2
 New String Algorithms Proposal for new string algorithms in TR2
 Toward a More Complete Taxonomy of Algebraic Properties for Numeric Libraries in TR2 ISO/IEC JTC1/SC22/WG21 - Papers 2008
 Adding heterogeneous comparison lookup to associative containers for TR2 

After the call was issued for proposals for TR2, ISO procedures were changed, so there will not be a TR2. Instead, enhancements to C++ will be published in a number of Technical Specifications. Some of the proposals listed above are already included in the C++ standard or in draft versions of the Technical Specifications.

See also
 C++11, standard for the C++ programming language; the library improvements were based on TR1
 C11 (C standard revision), the most recent standard for the C programming language
 Boost library, a large collection of portable C++ libraries, several of which were included in TR1
 Standard Template Library, part of the current C++ Standard Library

References

Sources

External links
 Scott Meyers' Effective C++: TR1 Information – contains links to the TR1 proposal documents which provide background and rationale for the TR1 libraries.

C++ Standard Library